The Inter Baku 2015–16 season is Inter Baku's fifteenth Azerbaijan Premier League season, and their first season under manager Zaur Svanadze. They will compete in the 2015–16 UEFA Europa League, entering at the first qualifying round stage, the Azerbaijan Cup and the League.

Squad
Out on loan

Transfers

Summer

In:

Out:

 

 

 

Winter

In:

Out:

 

Friendlies

Competitions

Azerbaijan Premier League

Results summary

Results

League table

Azerbaijan Cup

UEFA Europa League

Qualifying rounds

Squad statistics

Appearances and goals

|-
|colspan="14"|Players away from Inter Baku on loan:|-
|colspan="14"|Players who appeared for Inter Baku no longer at the club:''

|}

Goal scorers

Disciplinary record

Notes 

Qarabağ have played their home games at the Tofiq Bahramov Stadium since 1993 due to the ongoing situation in Quzanlı.

References

External links 
 Inter Baku at Soccerway.com

Shamakhi FK seasons
Azerbaijani football clubs 2015–16 season
Inter Baku